{{DISPLAYTITLE:C14H23NO}}
The molecular formula C14H23NO (molar mass: 221.34 g/mol, exact mass: 221.1780 u) may refer to:

 Spilanthol
 Tapentadol

Molecular formulas